Dioumaténé is a village and rural commune in the Cercle of Kadiolo in the Sikasso Region of southern Mali. The commune covers an area of 225 square kilometers and includes 5 villages. In the 2009 census it had a population of 4,274. The village of Dioumaténé, the administrative center (chef-lieu) of the commune, is 16 km west of Kadiolo.

References

External links
.

Communes of Sikasso Region